Teresa Okure (aged 80) is a Nigerian Catholic nun. She was the first African to become a member of the Society of the Holy Child Jesus. 
She is a Professor in residence of the Department of Bible Theology, at the Catholic Institute of West Africa, Port Harcourt, Nigeria. Okure teaches New Testament and Gender Hermeneutics, and has taught at the Institute since 1999.
She earned her Ph.D at Fordham University.
In 2013, she was noted as a possible candidate for appointment as a female cardinal by Pope Francis.

Works 

 The Johannine Approach to Mission (1988)
 To Cast Fire Upon the Earth (2000)

References

Living people
1940s births
Nigerian Roman Catholics
Nigerian Roman Catholic religious sisters and nuns
20th-century Roman Catholic theologians
21st-century Roman Catholic theologians